Building Hope is a film by Turk and Christy Pipkin. It was produced by The Nobelity Project and premiered on March 12 at the 2011 South by Southwest festival in Austin, Texas. It is the sequel to the film One Peace at a Time.

Summary
After rebuilding a rural Kenyan primary school, Turk Pipkin and The Nobelity Project agree to help build the area’s first high school - including the award-winning RainWater Court, classroom building, science and computer labs, and a library.
Through drought, flood, and fundraising challenges, Building Hope chronicles the construction of Mahiga Hope High, and the connection between a thousand people in the U.S. and an African community working to create a better future for their children.

Mahiga Hope High School
In 2009 The Nobelity Project began construction on Mahiga Hope High School in rural Kenya. It is the first high school in the area of Mahiga near Nyeri. The school held its grand opening on October 1, 2010.  The Nobelity Project is also building a science building for the school along with organic gardens to be completed in the fall of 2010. Construction of the school has earned the Nobelity Project a nomination for Architecture for Humanity's book, Design Like You Give a Damn 2, the sequel to Design Like You Give a Damn, which is a collection of writings about projects taking place around the world designed to benefit humanity.

Screenings and awards
Building Hope premiered on March 12 at the 2011 South by Southwest film festival. The film won the festivals' Lone Star Audience Award.
Winner of the 2011 Best Documentary Award at the Maui Film Festival.
Dove Family Seal of Approval
Public Premiere on April 6, 2011 at The Paramount Theatre in Austin, TX.
Premiered in New York at the Tribeca Cinemas on July 25, 2011.
San Diego Film Festival
Aspen Film Festival
Nairobi Film Festival
Napa Film Festival

References

External links

2011 films
Films set in Kenya
Documentary films about education